Alexander "Alex" Albistegi Revilla (born 1 July 1987) is a Spanish former professional footballer who played as a central midfielder, currently manager of Burgos CF Promesas.

He all but spent his 17-year senior career in the Segunda División B, in service of nine clubs. His Segunda División input consisted of 14 matches, one with Real Sociedad and 13 with Reus.

Club career

Real Sociedad
Born in Eibar, Gipuzkoa, Basque Country, Albistegi finished his youth career with local SD Eibar, making his senior debut with their reserves in the 2004–05 season, in Tercera División. After appearing with the first team in the Segunda División B he joined Real Sociedad in 2007, being initially assigned to the B side also of the third division.

On 19 June 2010, Albistegi made his professional debut with the Txuri-urdin, playing the last 24 minutes of a 4–1 Segunda División away loss against Elche CF. He returned to the third tier only two months later, signing on loan with former club Eibar.

Later years
Albistegi terminated his contract with Real Sociedad in August 2011, joining UD Logroñés the same month. He continued to compete in division three the following years, representing Real Unión, CD Toledo and Lleida Esportiu.

On 14 July 2016, Albistegi signed for CF Reus Deportiu, newly-promoted to the second division. The following 28 June, he agreed to a two-year contract with CD Mirandés one level below.

Albistegi remained in the third tier until his retirement at the age of 34, with spells at Lleida, Burgos CF, Unionistas de Salamanca CF, Burgos CF Promesas and Sestao River Club. In October 2022, he was named manager at the fourth of those clubs.

Personal life
Three of Albistegi's family members were also professional footballers: his grandfather Alberto featured in the top flight for Real Sociedad and CA Osasuna, his father Germán had links to Eibar and his paternal uncle, also named Alberto, played for Sociedad and Deportivo Alavés among others.

Honours
Eibar
Segunda División B: 2006–07

Real Sociedad B
Tercera División: 2009–10

Real Sociedad
Segunda División: 2009–10

References

External links

1987 births
Living people
Spanish footballers
Footballers from Eibar
Association football midfielders
Segunda División players
Segunda División B players
Tercera División players
SD Eibar footballers
Real Sociedad B footballers
Real Sociedad footballers
UD Logroñés players
Real Unión footballers
CD Toledo players
Lleida Esportiu footballers
CF Reus Deportiu players
CD Mirandés footballers
Burgos CF footballers
Unionistas de Salamanca CF players
Burgos CF Promesas players
Sestao River footballers
Spanish football managers
Segunda Federación managers